Tazehabad-e Jankah (also Romanized as Tāzehābād-e Jānkāh; also known as Tazabad, Tāzābād-e Jangā, Tāzābād-e Jangāh, Tāzehābād, Tāzehābād-e Jongā, and Tazeh Abad Siyah Gol) is a village in Khara Rud Rural District, in the Central District of Siahkal County, Gilan Province, Iran. At the 2006 census, its population was 966, in 233 families.

References 

Populated places in Siahkal County